Sander Gillé and Joran Vliegen were the defending champions but chose not to defend their title.

Nikola Čačić and Antonio Šančić won the title after defeating Sander Arends and David Pel 6–7(5–7), 7–6(7–3), [10–7] in the final.

Seeds

Draw

References

 Main draw

Sparkassen ATP Challenger - Doubles
2019 Doubles